The 88th season of the Campeonato Gaúcho kicked off on January 19, 2008. The competition began with 16 clubs divided into two groups. Even before the end of first stage, Guarany and 15 de Novembro were already relegated. Holders Grêmio had an early exit after being defeated by Juventude at homeground. Once again, the two biggest clubs of Rio Grande do Sul would not meet at the final. Internacional set a new record: the highest score in a final match, after beating Juventude 8-1 at Beira-Rio Stadium. That was the 38th title in the history of the club.

The tournament qualified both finalists to the Copa do Brasil (Brazil Cup) - Grêmio is also qualified based on CBF ranking criteria. As Internacional will play Série A and Juventude, Série B this season, the semifinal losers, Internacional of Santa Maria and Caxias qualified for the Série C (3rd level of National championship).

Teams

System
 Group Stage: The 16 teams were divided in 2 groups of 8 teams each. They played against each other inside their groups in home-and-away system. After 14 rounds, the top 4 teams qualified to the Quarterfinals and the bottom team from each group were relegated to play 2nd Division in 2009.
 Quarterfinals: Considering Group Stage positions, the 8 qualified teams were placed in 4 groups of 2 teams each which played in home-and-away system.
 Semifinals: Quarterfinals winners were divided in 2 groups of 2 teams each and they played in home-and-away system. Teams with best overall record played second leg at home
 Finals: Semifinals winners played in home-and-away to define Champions. Team with best overall record played second leg at home.

Group stage

Group 1

Fixtures

Group 2

Fixtures

Quarterfinals

First Leg: 29 and 30 March 
Second Leg: 5 and 6 April

Team 1 plays the second leg at home

Juventude won on away goals rule.

Semifinals
First Leg: 13 and 15 April 
Second Leg: 20 April

Team 1 plays the second leg at home

Final
First Leg: 27 April 
Second Leg: 4 May

Team 1 plays the second leg at home

Goals

Top Goal scorers

2008
2008 in Brazilian football leagues